St. Mary's County Public Schools (SMCPS) is a school district that serves St. Mary's County, Maryland, USA, at the confluence of the Potomac River, Patuxent River, and Chesapeake Bay. The area is a mixture of rural and suburban communities. Many of the families are employed by NAS Patuxent River, government contractors, St. Mary's College of Maryland, county government, and others involved in the traditional agriculture and water-related businesses. It has an approximate enrollment of almost 17,000 students. SMCPS operates 18 elementary schools, 5 middle schools, 4 high schools, an Alternative Learning Center, and a Vocational Training Center, serving students in Grades Pre-K through 12th grade. The school system is overseen by the Maryland State Department of Education.

The current Interim Superintendent of Schools is James Scott Smith, who assumed duties in August 2014, after the departure of the previous Superintendent, Dr. Michael J. Martirano, who accepted an offer to serve as the State Superintendent of Schools for the State of West Virginia.

High schools
Chopticon (Morganza)
Leonardtown (Leonardtown)
Great Mills (Great Mills)
Fairlead Academy (Leonardtown)

Middle schools
Esperanza (Lexington Park)
Leonardtown (Leonardtown)
Margaret Brent (Helen)
Spring Ridge (Lexington Park)
Chesapeake Public Charter School (Great Mills)

Elementary schools
Benjamin Banneker (Loveville)
Captain Walter Francis Duke (Leonardtown)
Dynard (Chaptico)
Evergreen (California)
George Washington Carver (Lexington Park)
Green Holly (Lexington Park)
Greenview Knolls (Great Mills)
Hollywood (Hollywood)
Leonardtown (Leonardtown)
Lettie Marshall Dent (Mechanicsville)
Lexington Park (Lexington Park)
Mechanicsville (Mechanicsville)
Oakville (Mechanicsville)
Park Hall (Park Hall)
Piney Point (Tall Timbers)
Ridge (Ridge)
Town Creek (Lexington Park)
White Marsh (Mechanicsville)

Other
Alternative Learning Center (Leonardtown)
Chesapeake Public Charter School (Great Mills)
Dr. James A. Forrest Career and Technology Center (Leonardtown)
Virtual Academy (Great Mills)

References

School districts in Maryland
Education in St. Mary's County, Maryland